Annette Ngozi Ilonzeh (born August 23, 1983) is a Nigerian-American actress. From 2010 to 2011, she played Maya Ward on the ABC daytime soap opera General Hospital, and later starred as Kate Prince in the short-lived ABC reboot of Charlie's Angels. She later had recurring roles on shows such as Arrow, Drop Dead Diva and Empire. In 2017, Ilonzeh played Kidada Jones in the biographical drama film  All Eyez on Me, and starred in the thriller 'Til Death Do Us Part. In 2018, she started co-starring as Emily Foster in the NBC drama Chicago Fire.

Life and career
Ilonzeh was born in Grapevine, Texas, and went to Colleyville Heritage High School. Her father is a Nigerian of Igbo descent, and her mother is white. In 2007, she made her television debut in an episode of the CBS sitcom How I Met Your Mother.  She had bit roles in the movies He's Just Not That Into You, Miss March and Percy Jackson & the Olympians: The Lightning Thief. Ilonzeh had a recurring role in the CW prime time soap opera Melrose Place from 2009 to 2010, and in 2010 guest starred in three episodes of Entourage. From 2010 to 2011, she played the role Maya Ward on the ABC daytime soap opera General Hospital.

In January 2011, Ilonzeh was announced as one of the "Angels" on the reboot of the 1970s television series Charlie's Angels. The series, which premiered in September 2011, received mostly negative reviews, and was cancelled the day after the fourth episode. In March 2012, it was announced that Ilonzeh would be recurring on The CW series Arrow. Later that year, she began appearing in a recurring role in the ABC Family drama series Switched at Birth. In 2013, she played a leading role in the Lifetime television film Killer Reality.
Ilonzeh also guest starred in the second season of CW's Beauty & the Beast, and had a recurring role on Lifetime comedy-drama Drop Dead Diva in 2013. Later, she had a recurring roles on Person of Interest and Empire.

In 2017, Ilonzeh had her first major film role, playing Kidada Jones in the biographical drama All Eyez on Me, about hip-hop artist Tupac Shakur. Later that year, appeared in the psychological thriller 'Til Death Do Us Part. In 2018, Ilonzeh appeared in the action thriller Peppermint, and was cast in a lead role on the ABC drama pilot Staties, which has yet to air as of October 2018.

In 2018, Ilonzeh began portraying Emily Foster in Dick Wolf's Chicago franchise, first starring in Chicago Fire. On April 16, 2020, it was reported that NBC/Wolf Entertainment officials informed Ilonzeh that she would not be renewing her contract which led to her leaving the series shortly after two seasons.

Filmography

Film

Television

References

External links 

 
 

1983 births
Living people
21st-century American actresses
Actresses from Texas
African-American actresses
American film actresses
American people of Nigerian descent
American soap opera actresses
American television actresses
Colleyville Heritage High School alumni
People from Grapevine, Texas
University of Texas at Arlington alumni
21st-century African-American women
21st-century African-American people
20th-century African-American people
20th-century African-American women
Igbo female models